! is the debut studio album by American indie rock band The Dismemberment Plan. It was released on October 3, 1995 on DeSoto Records. The band's original drummer Steve Cummings played on the album but left shortly after its release.

Track listing
"Survey Says" – 2:08
"The Things That Matter" – 2:25
"The Small Stuff" – 3:02
"OK Jokes Over" – 4:27
"Soon to Be Ex Quaker" – 1:26
"I'm Going to Buy You a Gun" – 3:06
"If I Don't Write" – 4:28
"Wouldn't You Like to Know?" – 2:50
"13th and Euclid" – 2:18
"Fantastic!" – 4:14
"Onward, Fat Girl" – 2:46
"Rusty" – 4:29
"The Dismemberment Plan Gets Rich" (Japanese bonus track) – 2:23

Personnel
The following people were involved in the making of !:
The Dismemberment Plan
Eric Axelson – bass
Jason Caddell – guitar
Steve Cummings – drums
Travis Morrison – vocals, guitar
Production
Andy Charneco and Don Zientara – recording

Footnotes

References

 
 
 
 
 

1995 debut albums
The Dismemberment Plan albums
DeSoto Records albums